The 1991 Estonian Football Championship was the last domestic top competition before Estonia regained independence from the Soviet Union in August 1991. Thirteen teams competed in this edition, with FC TVMK Tallinn winning the title. Although the league ended when Estonia was an independent state, Estonian Football Association decided not to count it as an official Estonian championship season.

League table

See also
1991 in Estonian football

References

Estonian Football Championship
Est
1